The JOHNNIAC was an early computer built by the RAND Corporation (not Remington Rand, maker of the contemporaneous UNIVAC I computer) and based on the von Neumann architecture that had been pioneered on the IAS machine. It was named in honor of von Neumann, short for John von Neumann Numerical Integrator and Automatic Computer. JOHNNIAC is arguably the longest operational early computer, being used almost continuously from 1953 for over 13 years before finally being shut down on February 11, 1966, logging over 50,000 operating hours.

After two "rescues" from the scrap heap, the machine is currently at the Computer History Museum in Mountain View, California.

Like the IAS machine, JOHNNIAC used 40-bit words, and included 1024 words of Selectron tube main memory, each holding 256 bits of data. Two instructions were stored in every word in 20-bit subwords consisting of an 8-bit instruction and a 12-bit address, the instructions being operated in series with the left subword running first. The initial machine had 83 instructions. A single register named A supplied an accumulator, and the machine also featured a register named Q, for quotient, as well. There was only one test condition, whether or not the high bit of the A register was set. There were no index registers, and as addresses were stored in the instructions, loops had to be implemented by modifying the instructions as the program ran. Since the machine only had 10 bits of address space, two of the address bits were unused and were sometimes used for data storage by interleaving data through the instructions.

Numerous modifications were made to the system over its lifetime. In March 1955, 4096 words of magnetic-core memory were added to the system, replacing the earlier Selectrons. This required all 12 bits of addressing, and caused programs that stored data in the "spare bits" to fail. Later in 1955 a 12k-word drum memory secondary storage system was added as well. A transistor-based adder replaced the original tube-based adder in 1956. Numerous changes were made to the input/output peripherals as well, and in 1964, a real-time clock was added to support time-sharing.

One JOHNNIAC legacy was the JOSS programming language (the JOHNNIAC Open Shop System), an easy-to-use language which catered to novices. JOSS was an ancestor of DEC's FOCAL and of MUMPS.

The CYCLONE at Iowa State University was a direct clone of JOHNNIAC, and was instruction compatible with it (the ILLIAC I may have been as well). Cyclone was later updated to include a hardware for floating-point arithmetic.

See also
 List of vacuum tube computers

References

External links 
 Johnniac entry on Antique Computers site.
 The History of the JOHNNIAC (RAND monograph)
 Oral history interview with Keith W. Uncapher, Charles Babbage Institute, University of Minnesota.  Review of projects at RAND Corporation when Keith Uncapher was hired in 1950 through the early 1970s, such as JOHNNIAC, JOSS, a survivable national network, and work related to the ARPANET.

IAS architecture computers
Vacuum tube computers
40-bit computers